Alex Tettey is the name of:

Alex Tettey-Enyo, Ghanaian politician
Alexander Tettey, Norwegian footballer